William Barry (1929 – 26 March 2007) was an Irish footballer. He competed in the men's tournament at the 1948 Summer Olympics.

References

External links
 

1929 births
2007 deaths
Republic of Ireland association footballers
Olympic footballers of Ireland
Footballers at the 1948 Summer Olympics
Place of birth missing
Association football midfielders